Stadio Antonio Bianco is a multi-use stadium in Gallipoli, Italy. It is currently used mostly for football matches and is the home ground of Gallipoli Football 1909. The stadium holds 5,000 people.

References 

Antonio Bianco
Gallipoli, Apulia
Buildings and structures in the Province of Lecce
1969 establishments in Italy
Sports venues completed in 1969